Patrick Frank Surtain II (born April 14, 2000) is an American football cornerback for the Denver Broncos of the National Football League (NFL). He played college football at Alabama and was drafted ninth overall by the Broncos in the 2021 NFL Draft. He is the son of former NFL player Patrick Surtain.

High school career
Surtain II attended American Heritage School in Plantation, Florida. He was coached by his father, Patrick Surtain, who played in the National Football League (NFL). Surtain II played in the 2018 U.S. Army All-American Bowl. A five-star recruit, he committed to play college football at the University of Alabama in 2018.

College career

As a true freshman at Alabama in 2018, Surtain II started 12 games and recorded 37 tackles and an interception. He returned to Alabama as a starter in 2019.

As a sophomore in 2019, he totaled 42 tackles, three forced fumbles, eight pass breakups, two interceptions (24 return yards), a fumble recovery, and one quarterback pressure.

In 2020, he again returned as a starter at cornerback, earning several preseason All-American honors.

He was named as the defensive MVP of the 2021 Rose Bowl.

Professional career

The Denver Broncos selected Surtain in the first round, with the ninth overall pick, of the 2021 NFL Draft. On May 18, 2021, Surtain signed his four-year rookie contract with Denver, worth $20.9 million.

During Week 2 on September 19, 2021, making his first career start due to an injury to Ronald Darby, Surtain recorded his first career interception off of fellow rookie Trevor Lawrence in a 23–13 road victory over the Jacksonville Jaguars.

In Week 12, Surtain had five tackles, two interceptions, including a 70-yard pick-six in a 28-13 win over the Los Angeles Chargers, earning AFC Defensive Player of the Week. He started in 16 games as a rookie, only missing the regular season finale. He finished with 58 total tackles (45 solo), four interceptions, and 14 passes defended.

Surtain was named to the 2021 All-Rookie Team by Pro Football Focus and the Pro Football Writers of America.

In the 2022 season, Surtain started in all 17 games. He finished with 60 total tackles (46 solo), two interceptions, ten passes defended, and one forced fumble. For his 2022 season, Surtain earned Pro Bowl and first team All-Pro honors.

References

External links

Denver Broncos bio
Alabama Crimson Tide bio

2000 births
Living people
People from Plantation, Florida
Sportspeople from Broward County, Florida
Players of American football from Florida
American football cornerbacks
Alabama Crimson Tide football players
All-American college football players
African-American players of American football
Denver Broncos players
21st-century African-American sportspeople
American Heritage School (Florida) alumni
American Conference Pro Bowl players